Darryl Bevon Roberts (born 26 September 1983 in Saint Joseph) is a Trinidadian footballer who last played for Kaya F.C–Iloilo and for the Trinidad and Tobago national team.

Club career

Youth and amateur
In Trinidad and Tobago, he attended El Dorado Junior Secondary school however than transferred to Fatima College (Secondary School) in 1998. He represented both schools at age divisional levels and Fatima College at the Intercol competition and North Zone league. Roberts attended Liberty University. In his first year, he was named Soccer America and College Soccer News Freshman All-American, was on the NSCAA South Atlantic All-Region second team honours, and was also named Big South Freshman of the Year and to the Big South All-Conference first team.

In his sophomore year he earned Big South all-conference second team honours and was a VaSID All-State second team selection, was named to the Trinidad and Tobago national football team in spring of 2003, becoming the first Liberty student-athlete to ever be named to a full national team. Roberts came to play in the United States in his late high school years. He was brought to High Point, NC to play for Trinidadian Anton Corneal's club '83 PSA Stars with future NCAA players Dane Brenner (USF), Osei Telesford (Liberty University, Chicago Fire), Hub Orr (Duke), Cliff Wright (Centre College), and Jordan Shaver (Hampden-Sydney).In his junior year he was an NSCAA South Atlantic All-Region second team selection, he was named to VaSID All-State second team and he also earned Big South all-conference second team honours. He is second on the Liberty all-time points list, and third in all time goals. While at Liberty, Roberts also played for Carolina Dynamo in the USL Premier Development League.

Club
Roberts was drafted by Toronto FC as the 14th overall pick of the 2007 MLS Supplemental Draft, but chose to move to Europe with Sparta Rotterdam instead. Toronto held his MLS rights for 2 seasons. However, he decided to look for opportunities in Europe and signed with Sparta Rotterdam. Roberts debuted for Sparta on 1 April 2007 in a home match against SC Heerenveen. Within two minutes he scored his first goal. His first full season also proved to be his last, then Sparta technical director Danny Blind deemed him surplus to requirements in April 2008.

He signed a 3-year contract with Süper Lig team Denizlispor on 9 July 2008. In three years at the club Roberts appeared in 80 league matches and scored 15 goals. After playing with the Charlotte Eagles for the second half of their 2012 season, Roberts returned to Turkey when he signed a two-year deal with Samsunspor in August 2012.

Roberts also played in the Philippines Football League. For played for Global Cebu and later Kaya-Iloilo. He left Kaya-Iloilo in January 2020.

International career
Roberts made his debut for the Soca Warriors in a January 2007 CONCACAF Gold Cup qualifying match against Barbados. He scored his first international goal against Martinique on 15 January 2007 in the 2007 Digicel Cup. His most recent goal came against Barbados on 6 September 2011 in a 2014 FIFA World Cup Qualifier.

International Goals
Scores and results list T&T's goal tally first.
 

Source

References

External links
 libertyflames.com
 Player profile – Sparta Rotterdam
 Career stats – Voetbal International 
 

1983 births
Living people
Trinidad and Tobago footballers
Trinidad and Tobago international footballers
2007 CONCACAF Gold Cup players
2013 CONCACAF Gold Cup players
North Carolina Fusion U23 players
Sparta Rotterdam players
Denizlispor footballers
Charlotte Eagles players
Liberty Flames men's soccer players
Samsunspor footballers
Trinidad and Tobago expatriate footballers
Trinidad and Tobago expatriate sportspeople in the United States
Expatriate soccer players in the United States
Trinidad and Tobago expatriate sportspeople in the Netherlands
Expatriate footballers in the Netherlands
Trinidad and Tobago expatriate sportspeople in Turkey
Expatriate footballers in Turkey
USL League Two players
Eredivisie players
Süper Lig players
Darryl Roberts
Darryl Roberts
USL Championship players
Toronto FC draft picks
Expatriate footballers in Thailand
Trinidad and Tobago expatriate sportspeople in Thailand
Association football forwards